Badami Bagh is a cantonment town on the outskirts of Srinagar city in Srinagar district  in the Indian union territory of Jammu and Kashmir. A portion of Indian army in the valley resides in the Badami Bagh cantonment. Badami Bagh Cantonment is the headquarters of the Indian Army's 15 Corps. The cantonment is established on the  two road sides of Srinagar Jammu National Highway.

Geography
It has an average elevation of 1727 metres (5666 feet).

Demographics
 India census, Badami Bagh had a population of 13,477. Males constitute 53% of the population and females 47%. Badami Bagh has an average literacy rate of 71%, higher than the national average of 59.5%; with 58% of the males and 42% of females literate. 6% of the population is under 6 years of age.

References

Cities and towns in Srinagar district
Cantonments of India